Playing for Keeps may refer to:

In film and television:
 Playing for Keeps (1986 film), a comedy film by Bob and Harvey Weinstein
 Playing for Keeps (2012 film), a romantic comedy film starring Gerard Butler
 Playing for Keeps (TV series), an Australian drama TV series that aired from 2019
 Gambler V: Playing for Keeps, a 1994 TV movie starring Kenny Rogers
 Playing for Keeps, a 2009 Canadian TV movie based on the Blue Edwards child-custody case
 "Playing for Keeps" (Diagnosis Murder), an episode of the TV series Diagnosis: Murder

In other media:
 Playing for Keeps (album), a 1980 album by Eddie Money
 "Playing for Keeps" (Elvis Presley song), a 1956 hit song by Elvis Presley
 "Playing for Keeps", a song from Elle King's 2012 EP The Elle King EP
 "Playing for Keeps", a 2019 song by D-Block Europe featuring Dave, from the album PTSD
 Playing for Keeps, a 1999 book about basketball player Michael Jordan by David Halberstam
 Playing for Keeps (novel), a 2007 book about superheroes by Mur Lafferty